Princess Luise Eleonore of Hohenlohe-Langenburg (11 August 1763, in Langenburg – 30 April 1837, in Meiningen) was a German regent.  She was duchess of Saxe-Meiningen by marriage to George I, Duke of Saxe-Meiningen, and Regent of Saxe-Meiningen during the minority of her son from 1803 to 1821.

Life
Louise Eleonore was a daughter of Prince Christian Albert Louis of Hohenlohe-Langenburg (1726-1789) and his wife Princess Caroline of Stolberg-Gedern (1732–1796).

On 27 November 1782, in Langenburg, she married George I, Duke of Saxe-Meiningen.

Regency

When her husband died on 24 December 1803, she took over as regent of the duchy for their son Bernhard II. She ruled with energy, courage, and good sense during the Napoleonic Wars, which for the next decade ravaged the Saxon states. 

The duchy was forced to join the Confederation of the Rhine during these Wars and provide it with troops; afterwards the duchy was struck with famine, which Luise sought to prevent by importing wheat.  French armies, and later those of Russia, marched back and forth across the country, but Luise refused to flee; she stayed with her infant son and two daughters inside their castle. 

She used every strategy to preserve the autonomy of her regency, so that when she joined the Allies in 1813, she had saved the duchy for her son. He became the ruling Duke of Meiningen eight years later. 

By adjustments in the duchy's administration she ensured the duchy was better managed and in 1821 opened the Gymnasium Bernhardinum in Meiningen (already begun by her husband). 

Her children were carefully educated, with a grand tour to Italy under their tutor Johann Heinrich Pestalozzi.  After her son came of age, Luise retired as regent and went on several foreign trips, including one to England to visit her daughter Adelaide.

Issue

Adelheid  (later Adelaide, 13 August 1792 – 2 December 1849), with whom Luise had a very close relationship; in 1818 she married King William IV of the United Kingdom while Luise was regent and special taxes needed to be instituted in the duchy to raise funds for her enormous dowry (6,000 florins per year).
Ida (25 June 1794 – 4 April 1852), married Prince Bernhard of Saxe-Weimar-Eisenach.
Stillborn daughter (16 October 1796).
Bernhard II, Duke of Saxe-Meiningen, (17 December 1800 – 3 December 1882), married Princess Marie Fredericka of Hesse-Kassel (1804–1888).

Ancestry

References

Sources
  L. Hertel, Schriften des Vereins für Sachsen-Meiningische Geschichte und Landeskunde, Hildburghausen 1903
 

1763 births
1837 deaths
Regents of Germany
Princesses of Hohenlohe-Langenburg
Duchesses of Saxe-Meiningen
House of Saxe-Meiningen
House of Hohenlohe-Langenburg
19th-century women rulers
People from Langenburg